Lupul  is a Romanian language surname literally meaning "the wolf" ("lup" + Romanian definite article).  Variant: Lupu

Lupul may refer to:

 Joffrey Lupul (born 1983), ice hockey player
 Gary Lupul (1959–2007), ice hockey player

See also 
 Lupul (disambiguation)
 Lupu (surname)

Romanian-language surnames